Bruce Johnston (born 1942) is an American musician and singer-songwriter.

Bruce Johnston may refer to:

Bruce Johnston (criminal) (1939–2002), American gang leader

See also
Bruce Johnstone (disambiguation)
Bruce Johnson (disambiguation)